Abby Angelos is an American politician and a Republican member of the Wyoming House of Representatives representing the 3rd district since January 10, 2023.

Political career

After incumbent Republican representative and Speaker of the House Eric Barlow retired to run for the state senate, Angelos declared her candidacy. She ran in the Republican primary on August 16, 2022, and defeated Rusty Bell with 61% of the vote. She then won the general election on November 8, 2022, unopposed.

References

External links
Profile from Ballotpedia

Living people
Republican Party members of the Wyoming House of Representatives
People from Gillette, Wyoming
Women state legislators in Wyoming
21st-century American politicians
Year of birth missing (living people)